Fortuna Forest Reserve is a 206.54 km² forest reserve in the mountains of Chiriquí Province, Panama.

Geography 
The reserve covers mountain forests and cloud forest and of origin volcanic soil. The Cerro Chorcha is the highest point of the Fortuna Forest Reserve at 2,213 meters above sea level. More than 4,000 millimeters of rain falls in the reserve every year. The average temperature is 20°C with a minimum of 10°C and a maximum of 27°C during a day. By means of a dam, hydroelectricity is being generated in the reserve.

Flora and Fauna 
Forest is home for 1,136 plant species.

Fauna 
Fortuna Forest Reserve has the highest number of endemic species of any protected area in Panama. In particular, the diversity of amphibians is great. It is home for 70 amphibians and reptiles. The bird species in the reserve include the Resplendent quetzal, Military macaw and Toucan. Besides small mammals, the jaguar can also be found in Reserve.

History 
On September 21, 1976 Fortuna was declared a forest reserve. In 2001 an agreement was signed with the Smithsonian Tropical Research Institute and since then various scientific studies have been carried out in the reserve, such as on disappearing amphibian populations and the influence of climate change on epiphytes.

See also
Protected areas of Panama

References

Protected areas of Panama